The Catholic Diocese of Wonju is a diocese of the Latin Church of the Catholic Church in located in Wonju, South Korea. It is a suffragan to the Archdiocese of Seoul.

History
On 22 March 1965 Pope Paul VI established the Diocese of Wonju. Churches in Hoengseong, Pyeongchang, Jecheon and Danyang was transferred to Diocese of Wonju on 1 May 1969. The diocese lost territory later that year when the Diocese of Andong was established on 29 May 1969. The diocese acquired a 40 percent share of Wonju Munwha Broadcasting Corporation in 1970.

Leadership

Ordinaries
Daniel Tji Hak-soun (1965–1993)
James Kim Ji-seok (1993–2016)
Basil Cho Kyu-man (2016–present)

Coadjutor Bishops
James Kim Ji-seok (1990–1993)

Notes

Wonju
Christian organizations established in 1965
Wonju
Wonju
Roman Catholic Ecclesiastical Province of Seoul